Federal Constitutional Law is the core of the Austrian Constitution.

Federal Constitutional Law may also refer to:

 German constitutional law, a body of law dealing with Germany's constitution and institutions
 Federal Constitutional Law (Russia), a body of law enacted in important areas of constitutional law

See also 
 Constitutional law (disambiguation)
 Federal law (disambiguation)